Linda Laura Lecca (born 13 July 1988) is a Peruvian professional boxer. She held the WBA female super flyweight title from 2016 to 2018 and challenged for the WBO female super flyweight title in 2014 and 2018.

Professional career
Lecca made her professional debut on 5 June 2010, scoring a four-round split decision (SD) victory against Roxana Virginia Baron at the Estadio F.A.B. in Buenos Aires, Argentina.

After compiling a record of 3–1–1, she participated in the Mexican reality TV show Todas Contra México in 2011. She had three bouts on the show, winning the first two and losing the third against future world champion Yazmín Rivas. All three bouts are listed as no contests (NC) by record keeping website BoxRec due to the events not being officially sanctioned by Mexico's boxing commission.

Following the loss to Rivas, Lecca defeated Mayra Alejandra Gomez via ten-round unanimous decision (UD) on 14 April 2012, capturing the vacant South American female super bantamweight title at the Estadio Ruca Che in Neuquén, Argentina.

Two years later she faced Daniela Romina Bermúdez for the vacant WBO female super flyweight title on 4 January 2014, at the Piso de los Deportes in Mar del Plata, Argentina. Lecca suffered the second defeat of her career, losing via eighth-round technical knockout (TKO) in a scheduled ten-round bout.

Following her loss to Bermúdez, Lecca defeated Maria Vega via eight-round UD on 8 March 2014, capturing the vacant WBA Fedelatin female super bantamweight title at the Coliseo Dibos Dammert in Lima, Peru.

She next faced Simone da Silva for the vacant WBA interim female super flyweight title on 31 May 2014, at the Complejo Deportivo "El Chancherín" in Huarochirí, Peru. Lecca defeated Da Silva via UD over ten rounds. She made two successful defences, scoring UD victories against Guadalupe Martínez Guzmán and Maribel Ramírez in August and November, respectively, before making a third defence against Carolina Álvarez on 28 March 2015, at the Mega Plaza Norte in Lima. The bout was stopped in the second round and declared a NC after Lecca suffered a cut from an accidental clash of heads, with Lecca retaining her interim title. Lecca and Álvarez met in a rematch in June the following year, with the WBA female super flyweight title on the line after Lecca was elevated to full champion. Lecca retained her title through a split draw (SD), with one judge scoring the bout 98–92 in favour of Lecca, the second judge scoring it 100–90 for Álvarez while the third judge scored it 95–95. The event was recognised by Guinness World Records for having the most female world championship fights, with four world titles being contested on the night.

After retaining her title with a UD victory against Karina Fernández in August 2017, she faced former foe Maribel Ramírez on 19 May 2018, at the Plaza Mall Sur in Lima. Lecca suffered the third defeat of her career, losing her WBA title via majority decision (MD), with two judges scoring the bout 98–93 and 96–94 in favour of Ramírez, while the third judge scored it even with 95–95.

Following the loss of her title, Lecca challenged WBO female super flyweight champion Raja Amasheh on 14 September 2018, at Palazzohalle in Karlsruhe, Germany. With the honorary WBC Diamond title also on the line, Lecca suffered her second consecutive defeat, losing via UD. Two judges scored the bout 97–93 and the third scored it 100–90.

Professional boxing record

References

External links

Living people
1988 births
Peruvian women boxers
Super-flyweight boxers
Super-bantamweight boxers
World super-flyweight boxing champions
World Boxing Association champions